Hallanan is a surname. Notable people with the surname include:

 Elizabeth Virginia Hallanan (1925–2004), American judge
 Walter S. Hallanan (1889/1890–1962), West Virginia politician

Surnames of British Isles origin
Surnames of Scottish origin